The Peach Kings are an American rock band that formed in 2010 by Texas-born Paige Wood and Los Angeles native Steven Dies.

Early life and influences 

Wood was raised by a Louisiana-born mother, whom she cites as giving her a gospel influence, in addition to listening to Joni Mitchell, Tom Waits, Aretha Franklin, Robert Plant, Françoise Hardy, and PJ Harvey, and singing jazz and playing jazz music on the piano. She is a former solo artist and Warped Tour alum who performed in New York City before relocating to the West Coast. Wood learned the guitar from listening to blues albums including Jimi Hendrix and Jimmy Page, along with Tom Morello, Neil Young, Tony Iommi, John Frusciante, and Wes Montgomery, and went on to study music at UC Berkeley. On exchange in Argentina she met Luis Alberto Spinetta of the 60s band Pescado Rabioso, whom she cites as one of her biggest musical influences and a "guitar genius/weirdo/psychedelic", along with The Dead Weather. Both Wood and Dies have acknowledged Juliette Lewis, Billy Bob Thornton, Abbe May and Trent Reznor as artists they would love to collaborate with.

The duo met in San Francisco when Wood became roommates with Dies' brother, who suggested that the two of them form a band. Wood and Dies met up, began playing together and quickly formed The Peach Kings. They discovered that Wood's grandmother had taught Dies' mother seventh-grade English in Texas, despite never having met previously. They chose the name The Peach Kings after sharing a peach the first time they met.

The band has a self-described sound of "gypsadelia" and has cited PJ Harvey, Nancy Sinatra, The Cramps, Lou Reed, Lee Hazlewood, and Portishead as musical influences in addition to the vibe of cult films and directors David Lynch, Quentin Tarantino, and Paul Thomas Anderson. The band describes it as "everything cool about film noir applied to rock n roll." They also describe themselves as being "all over the place" in terms of drawing their inspiration, including Little Dragon, Led Zeppelin, Roy Orbison, Tom Waits, and Devo, but only getting that "LA Rock" sound from "time-to-time." Both band members love spy novels and mystery thrillers, in addition to James Bond theme songs which Wood says they drew inspiration from for some of their lyrics. Both Wood and Dies write the lyrics for the songs in either structured collaboration or bits and pieces at a time, with Dies writing the Spanish lyrics. Wood is also influenced by her love of things that have a "rich history and a story behind them" and describes herself as "a very visual person", with her surroundings and environment helping set the mood while she writes lyrics.

The Peach Kings have been featured by The Huffington Post and Buzzbands.la. The Huffington post being quoted as saying that the band has a "very gritty, yet sultry vibe that ties it all together." When asked about the message of their music, Wood and Dies said, "That's the thing about music, the listener can do whatever they want and they want to interpret what it means to them. We don't presume for people to take away anything specific from our music, we try to play what we hear in our heads and let people decide on their own."

Use in media 

The Peach Kings have had music featured in several movies, TV shows and online media spots including tracks such as Fisherman and Like A Stone on season 4 of the Showtime series Shameless, and Thieves & Kings for the full run of season 4 of HBO's Boardwalk Empire. The band was also filmed by Audi for the digital campaign for Audi Connect. Wood says, "Hearing your music on the big screen is great, the fact that directors like to fit your song to something they envision is a huge honor."

The band was hand-picked by Drew Barrymore for the V Magazine Playlist in 2012, also featuring Mayer Hawthorne, Mac Miller, M83, Spank Rock, Warpaint, The Drums, Lord Huron, and Audra Mae & The Almighty Sound. Drew Barrymore was quoted as saying, "The Peach Kings are my little love couple, and I adore the romance of a man and woman who make music together."

Additionally, The Peach Kings have had tracks featured in FOX's Gotham, MTV's Catfish: The TV Show, NBC's Do No Harm, VH1's Mob Wives, CW Network's Arrow, United States's Necessary Roughness, the Lions Gate film Thanks For Sharing, and the films Deserted, Free Ride, and online for Red Bull Media House.

Concert tours and residencies

Headlining tours 

The Peach Kings completed an eight-week national headlining tour "Night Sweat" in the summer of 2016, beginning in July in Phoenix, Arizona. The band previously set up meet and greets in coffee and tea shops with fans on tour in hopes of making the tour "bigger yet more intimate than just playing shows" and wanting to meet fans.

Supporting tours 

In 2015, while recording the studio album Lover's Leap, The Peach Kings performed live with Reggie Watts at El Cid in Los Angeles.

In 2016, The Peach Kings performed at the SXSW Festival for the second year in a row in March, and toured the US West Coast with The Heavy in April and May.

In May, the band toured across the United States as the opening act for Cyndi Lauper's Detour Tour in May and June, starting at the Ryman Auditorium in Nashville. The Examiner called the "forty-minute set of smoldering rockabilly" "Sleazy... but sexy," adding "Paige Wood and Steven Dies wowed... the former mesmerizing onlookers with her smoky voice and pinup figure and the latter with his Link Wray six-string slight of hand." In Atlanta, The Peach Kings opened with Thieves and Kings and Mojo Thunder before joining Lauper, who Wood has cited as one of her idols, on stage for a "rousing" rendition of "Girls Just Want To Have Fun". Reviews said they "cannot get enough of" The Peach Kings and noted the "searing" chemistry during their act.

Residencies 

The Peach Kings have had residencies at The Bootleg Theater, Harvard & Stone, and Echoplex.

They performed at the Make Music Festival in 2013, the Sunset Strip Festival and to sold-out audiences at Arlene's Grocery for CMJ in New York City.

Their performances have garnered rave reviews and praise, including:

"Onstage, Dies is the spark to Wood's vocal live wire, his no-nonsense grooves and catchy riffs setting the framework for their reverb-drenched songs. Wood's smoldering tones can explode into flames with the twist of a syllable." - Pasadena Weekly

"The Peach Kings' brand of Americana noir gets headier with every EP, and if there isn't a brand of liquor called Mojo Thunder yet, somebody better get distilling." - Buzz Bands LA

"Together they make an inspiring live act: fun, dynamic, engaging, rockin' and personal. Every member of the audience felt like a close friend." - Best New Bands

"... the title track off of [Mojo Thunder] EP features Paige's hypnotic alto while the raw guitar riffs create a vibe that would be easily found in a Tarantino movie." - Indie Shuffle

Discography 

The Peach Kings released their first independent EP Handsome Moves on September 6, 2012. The album featured tracks "Fisherman", "Do It For Me", "Lonely", "Like A Stone", "Soon Will Be", and "Thieves & Kings". The album has also been available on vinyl since 2012. KCRW called Handsome Moves "a perfect calling card, alerting the world that the Peach Kings are a force to be reckoned with and that they are ready to mount their throne."

They released their second independent EP Mojo Thunder on June 3, 2014. The album featured tracks "Mojo Thunder", "Hold On", "Say What", "Be Around", and "Mojo Thunder (Kent Rockafeller Mix)".

Their debut full-length studio album Lover's Leap is due to be released in 2016.

They have also released several singles, garnered acclaim for their music videos, earned multiple Vimeo Staff Picks and over half a million views on YouTube and Vimeo, in addition to multiple "Today's Top Tune" honors on LA radio stations.

Their track "Easy" was featured on "Playlists by Alexander Wang".

Awards and nominations 

In 2010, The Peach Kings won "Unsigned Artist of the Year" in a competition by Paste Magazine and Alternative Apparel.

References

External links 

American indie rock groups
Rock music groups from California
Indie rock musical groups from California